Steven Ross Dixon (born August 3, 1969) is a former Major League Baseball pitcher.

External links
, or Retrosheet
Pelota Binaria (Venezuelan Winter League)

1969 births
Living people
Arkansas Travelers players
Baseball players from Cincinnati
Binghamton Mets players
Cardenales de Lara players
American expatriate baseball players in Venezuela
Iowa Cubs players
Johnson City Cardinals players
Kentucky Wildcats baseball players
Louisville Redbirds players
Major League Baseball pitchers
Rochester Red Wings players
St. Louis Cardinals players
St. Petersburg Cardinals players